Dedicato a mio padre is an album by Italian singer Mina, released in 1967. It is the first independently produced album through her record label PDU.

Track listing

1967 albums
Italian-language albums
Mina (Italian singer) albums